Tridrepana obliquitaenia is a moth in the family Drepanidae. It was described by Warren in 1922. It is widely distributed in New Guinea.

The wingspan is about 35.2-41.8 mm for males. Adults are easily distinguished from related species by the colour pattern of the upperside.

References

Moths described in 1922
Drepaninae
Moths of New Guinea